6110 may refer to:
Nokia 6110, a mobile phone released in 1997
Nokia 6110 Navigator, a smartphone released in 2007
A6110 road, in England